Talochlamys zelandiae, common name the New Zealand fan shell, is a species of bivalve mollusc in the scallop family Pectinidae.

Distribution
This species occurs at littoral–bathyal depths off New Zealand.

References

 Powell A. W. B., New Zealand Mollusca, William Collins Publishers Ltd, Auckland, New Zealand 1979 
 Hertlein L.G. (1931). Changes of Nomenclature of Some Recent and Fossil Pectinidae from Japan, Porto Rico, South America, New Zealand, and California. Journal of Paleontology. 5(4): 367-369
 Finlay, H. J. (1928). The Recent Mollusca of the Chatham Islands. Transactions of the New Zealand Institute. 59: 232-286.
 Fleming, C.A. (1948) New species and genera of marine Mollusca from the Southland Fiords. Transactions of the Royal Society of New Zealand, 77, 72–92
 Dijkstra, H. H.; Marshall, B. A. (2008). The Recent Pectinoidea of the New Zealand region (Mollusca: Bivalvia: Propeamussiidae, Pectinidae and Spondylidae). Molluscan Research. 28 (1): 1-88
 Spencer, H.G., Marshall, B.A. & Willan, R.C. (2009). Checklist of New Zealand living Mollusca. pp 196–219. in: Gordon, D.P. (ed.) New Zealand inventory of biodiversity. Volume one. Kingdom Animalia: Radiata, Lophotrochozoa, Deuterostomia. Canterbury University Press,
 Maxwell, P.A. (2009). Cenozoic Mollusca. pp 232–254 in Gordon, D.P. (ed.) New Zealand inventory of biodiversity. Volume one. Kingdom Animalia: Radiata, Lophotrochozoa, Deuterostomia. Canterbury University Press, Christchurch

External links
 Gray, J. E. (1843). Catalogue of the species of Mollusca and their shells, which have hitherto been recorded as found at New Zealand, with the description of some lately discovered species. In: Dieffenbach, E. Travels in New Zealand; with contributions to the geography, geology, botany, and natural history of that country, vol. 2: 228-265
 Gould, A. A. (1850). [descriptions of new species of shells from the United States Exploring Expedition]. Proceedings of the Boston Society of Natural History. 3: 151-156, 169–172, 214-218, 252–256, 275–278, 292–296, 309–312, 343–348
 Reeve, L. A. (1852-1853). Monograph of the genus Pecten. In: Conchologia Iconica, or, illustrations of the shells of molluscous animals, vol. 8, pl. 1-35 and unpaginated text. L. Reeve & Co., London.
 Bavay, A. (1905). Sur quelques espèces nouvelles, mal connues ou faisant double emploi dans le genre Pecten. Journal de Conchyliologie. 53: 18-30, pl. 2

Bivalves of New Zealand
Bivalves described in 1843
Taxa named by John Edward Gray
Pectinidae